The CSR SDD7 is a 2,249 hp diesel-electric locomotive manufactured by CSR Corporation Limited from 2013 onwards for use in Argentina by Trenes Argentinos, a subsidiary of Ferrocarriles Argentinos S.E. On the San Martín Line in Buenos Aires Province, 24 of these locomotives are used, making up the entire rolling stock of the commuter rail line.

Technical specifications 
The locomotive has one conductor's cabin on each end, connected by an internal corridor. Its total weight is 114 tonnes with a maximum weight per axle of 19 tonnes. The 3516B engine is manufactured by Caterpillar and generates 1678 kW, with the locomotive having a maximum speed of 120 km/h. Each axle has an independent traction motor, which are controlled by two microprocessors.

Each locomotive has a 6000-litre fuel capacity, carries 420 kg of lubricants, 800 litres of water and 400 kg of sand in its sandboxes.

Usage 
In Argentina, the locomotives are used exclusively for the San Martín Line of the General San Martín Railway. Despite there being plans for electrification, the 24 trains make up the entirety of the line's rolling stock. During the integration of this new rolling stock, the stations on the lines were also modernised and restored. As of 2015, the electrification of the line is being considered, which would mean the rolling stock would be moved elsewhere.

In 2018 Transmashholding Argentina was awarded a contract to refurbish and update the locomotives and their respective carriages.

Gallery

See also
CNR CKD8
CSR EMU (Argentina)
Trenes Argentinos
Ferrocarriles Argentinos (2015)

References

External links

 SDD7 Diesel Locomotive at CSR website

CRRC Group
Diesel-electric locomotives of Argentina
Articles containing video clips
Railway locomotives introduced in 2013
5 ft 6 in gauge locomotives